The Linke-Hofmann R.II (Riesenflugzeug – "giant aircraft") was a  bomber aircraft designed and built in Germany from 1917.

Design and development 
The Linke-Hofmann R.I had disappointing performance and handling, as well as structural weakness with both prototypes crashing. Linke-Hofmann took a radically different approach for their second Riesenflugzeug, the Linke-Hofmann R.II. The R.II was an approximately three-fold scale-up of a conventional single-engined biplane, powered by a quartet of Mercedes D.IVa inline-six engines turning a single 6.90 meter (22 ft 7.5 in) diameter tractor propeller, the largest single propeller ever used to propel any aircraft in aviation history. The quartet of Mercedes powerplants  were arranged in pairs in the central fuselage and drove the propeller through clutches, shafts and gearboxes.

The airframe was constructed largely of wood, with plywood covering the forward fuselage and a steel-tube v-strut chassis main undercarriage with two wheels and a tail-skid at the aft end of the fuselage. Two examples of the R.II had been completed by the time of the Armistice. They bore the IdFlieg German military registration numbers R.55/17 and R.56/17.

Flight testing of R 55/17 was carried out after the Armistice in 1919, demonstrating acceptable performance and handling, being able to fly happily with only two engines driving the enormous propeller. Normal endurance was estimated to be 7 hours, but with adjustment of load and a cruising speed of  it was estimated that the R.II could stay aloft for 30 hours.

There were plans to make it a 12-passenger airliner after the war, but the restrictions of the Versailles Treaty ended further development.

Specifications (Linke-Hofmann R.II)

See also

Notes

References
Citations

Further reading

  
 - archived page 1 of 4

 - archived page 2 of 4

 - archived page 3 of 4

 - archived page 4 of 4

External links
 http://www.airwar.ru/enc/bww1/linker2.html
 FlyingMachines.ru Linke-Hofmann R.II page 

1910s German bomber aircraft
Four-engined tractor aircraft
Four-engined piston aircraft
Aircraft first flown in 1919

de:Linke-Hofmann R-Typen